The following is a list of deaths in August 2009.

Entries for each day are listed alphabetically by surname. A typical entry lists information in the following sequence:

 Name, age, country of citizenship at birth, subsequent country of citizenship (if applicable), reason for notability, cause of death (if known), and reference.

August 2009

1
Jerome Anderson, 55, American basketball player (Boston Celtics) and coach.
Corazon Aquino, 76, Filipino politician, first female President (1986–1992), colon cancer.
Devendra Nath Dwivedi, 74, Indian politician, Governor designate of Gujarat.
Edward D. Ives, 83, American folklorist and professor.
Keith Macklin, 78, British journalist and broadcaster.
George Taylor Morris, 62, American radio personality, throat cancer.
Andy Parle, 42, British drummer and co-founder of the band Space, heart failure. 
Nicholas D'Antonio Salza, 93, Honduran Bishop of Juticalpa (1963–1977).
Naomi Sims, 61, American model and author, breast cancer.
Rana Chandra Singh, 78, Pakistani politician.
Howard Smit, 98, American film make-up artist (The Wizard of Oz).
Panakkad Sayeed Mohammedali Shihab Thangal, 73, Indian politician, cardiac arrest.
Borka Vučić, 83, Serbian politician and banker, traffic collision.

2
Shafiq al-Hout, 77, Palestinian politician, co-founder of the Palestine Liberation Organization, cancer.
Adolf Endler, 78, German writer.
Hironoshin Furuhashi, 80, Japanese swimmer, Vice President of FINA.
Mark Green, 92, British prelate, Bishop of Aston (1972–1982).
Billy Lee Riley, 75, American rockabilly musician, cancer.
Stanley Robertson, 68, British folk singer and storyteller.
Michael A. Wiener, 71, American radio mogul (Infinity Broadcasting) and philanthropist, cancer.
Sidney Zion, 75, American journalist, cancer.

3
Subhas Chakrabarty, 66, Indian politician.
Christopher Elrington, 79, English historian, general editor of the Victoria County History.
Zelik Epstein, 96, American rabbi and rosh yeshiva.
Charles Gwathmey, 71, American architect, esophageal cancer.
Walter Philip Leber, 90, American Governor of the Panama Canal Zone (1967–1971).
Nikolaos Makarezos, 90, Greek army officer, leader of the Greek military junta of 1967–1974.
Svend Ove Pedersen, 88, Danish Olympic bronze medal-winning (1952) rower.
Zinovy Vysokovsky, 76, Russian actor.

4
Hirotugu Akaike, 81, Japanese statistician, pneumonia.
Dave Ames, 72, American football player (New York Titans), ALS.
Svend Auken, 66, Danish politician, prostate cancer.
Benson, c. 25, British common carp, voted as Britain's Favourite Carp (death announced on this date).
George I. Cannon, 89, American church leader (The Church of Jesus Christ of Latter-day Saints).
Ross Dufty, 81, Australian cricketer.
Charles Gaylord, 72, American martial arts grandmaster (Kajukenbo).
Sir David Haslam, 86, British admiral.
Jo O-ryeon, 56, South Korean Olympic swimmer.
Ergash Karimov, 75, Uzbek actor and comedian.
Amos Kenan, 82, Israeli columnist, painter, sculptor, playwright and novelist, Alzheimer's disease.
Günther Morbach, 81, German classical bass in opera and concert.
Joseph Msika, 85, Zimbabwean politician, Vice President, stroke.
Gonzalo Santos, 68, Northern Mariana Island Cabinet member, educator and principal, lung cancer.
Blake Snyder, 51, American screenwriter and author, cardiac arrest.
Ole A. Sørli, 63, Norwegian manager and record producer. 
Mbah Surip, 60, Indonesian reggae singer, heart attack.
Robert Mitsuhiro Takasugi, 78, American federal judge.
Martha Ware, 91, American judge, first female judge in Plymouth County, Massachusetts.
James Wiegold, 75, Welsh mathematician, leukemia.

5
Gerald Cohen, 68, Canadian Marxist political philosopher.
Jordi Sabater Pi, 87, Spanish ethologist, discovered albino gorilla Snowflake.
Sheikha Hessa bint Salman Al Khalifa, c. 76, Bahraini royal, widow of Isa ibn Salman Al Khalifah, mother of King Hamad ibn Isa Al Khalifah.
Baitullah Mehsud, c. 35, Pakistani militant, injuries resulting from a military strike.
Budd Schulberg, 95, American screenwriter (On the Waterfront), playwright and novelist.
Daljit Singh, 73-74, Indian cricketer.
Al Tomko, 77, Canadian professional wrestler, pancreatic cancer.

6
Bahadır Akkuzu, 54, Turkish musician, heart attack. 
Rolf Back, 81, Finnish Olympic sprinter. Rolf Back
Helen Brotherton, 95, British conservationist.
Maup Caransa, 93, Dutch property developer.
Riccardo Cassin, 100, Italian mountaineer.
Savka Dabčević-Kučar, 85, Croatian politician. 
Willy DeVille, 58, American singer–songwriter (Mink DeVille), pancreatic cancer.
Stanley Haidasz, 86, Canadian politician, MP for Trinity (1957–1958) and Parkdale (1962–1978), Senator (1978–1998).
Charles Townsend Harrison, 67, British art historian.
John Hughes, 59, American director, screenwriter, and producer (Home Alone, The Breakfast Club), heart attack.
Anthony Impreveduto, 61, American corrupt politician, member of the New Jersey General Assembly (1987–2004), lymphoma.
Jack T. Kirby, 70, American historian, winner of the 2007 Bancroft Prize, heart failure.
Anilza Leoni, 75, Brazilian actress, emphysema.
Donald Marshall, Jr., 55, Canadian wrongfully convicted of murder, complications from a lung transplant.
Murali, 55, Indian actor, heart attack.
Reiko Ohara, 62, Japanese actress (body discovered on this date).
Willibrordus S. Rendra, 73, Indonesian poet.
Sam, 4, Australian koala made famous after the 2009 Black Saturday bushfires, euthanised.
Aram Tigran, 75, Armenian singer and oud player.
Otha Young, 66, American musician and songwriter, cancer.

7
Jimmy Bedford, 69, American distiller (Jack Daniel's), heart attack.
Frank G. Dickey, 91, American educator, president of the University of Kentucky (1956–1963).
Gibson, 7, American Great Dane therapy dog, recognized by Guinness Book of World Records as world's tallest dog, bone cancer.
Carleen Hutchins, 98, American violin maker.
Taha Muhie-eldin Marouf, 80, Iraqi politician, Vice President (1975–2003).
Gulshan Kumar Mehta, 72, Indian songwriter, heart failure.
John Harber Phillips, 75, Australian jurist, Chief Justice of Victoria (1991–2003).
Danko Popović, 81, Serbian writer. 
Louis E. Saavedra, 76, American politician, Mayor of Albuquerque, New Mexico (1973; 1989–1993), brain cancer.
Mike Seeger, 75, American folk musician, folklorist and banjo player, cancer.
Paul Silver, 60, American seismologist, traffic collision.
Sergio Stefanini, 87, Italian Olympic basketball player
Tatiana Stepa, 46, Romanian folk singer, cervical cancer.
Seiichi Tagawa, 91, Japanese politician, party leader (New Liberal Club).
Anne Wexler, 79, American political adviser and lobbyist, breast cancer.

8
Alfonso Calderón, 78, Chilean writer and poet, heart attack.
Yehuda Cohen, 95, Israeli Supreme Court justice.
Cal Ermer, 85, American baseball coach and manager (Minnesota Twins).
Harold Hitchcock, 95, British artist.
Daniel Jarque, 26, Spanish footballer, heart attack.
Pål Kraby, 77, Norwegian barrister and businessman. 
Peter Milton, 80, Australian politician, MP (1980–1990).
Jone Railomo, 28, Fijian rugby player, member of the Fiji 2007 Rugby World Cup team.
Barnett Rosenberg, 82, American chemist, discovered cisplatin.
Raul Solnado, 79, Portuguese actor and comedian, cardiovascular disease. 
Michael Viner, 65, American record producer (Incredible Bongo Band), cancer.
Jerry Wisdom, 61, Bahamian Olympic sprinter. Jerry Wisdom

9
Frank Borth, 91, American comic book artist.
Tommy Clinton, 83, Irish footballer (Everton, Republic of Ireland).
Thierry Jonquet, 55, French writer. 
William Lindsay Osteen, Sr., 79, American judge of the District Court for the Middle District of North Carolina (1991–2006).
John Quade, 71, American character actor (Every Which Way But Loose, The Outlaw Josey Wales).
Rodney Scott Webb, 74, American federal judge, cancer.
Jasmine You, 30, Japanese bassist (Versailles).

10
Laurie Bickerton, 92, Australian football player.
Josef Burg, 97, Ukrainian Yiddish writer, stroke.
Alik Djabrailov, 42, Russian charity worker, shot.
Peter Dunnill, 71, British biochemical engineer.
Albert L. Gordon, 94, American gay rights legal activist.
Rita Inos, 55, Northern Mariana Island educator and politician, first female candidate for Lieutenant Governor, cancer.
Andy Kessler, 48, American skateboarder, wasp sting.
Ede Király, 82, Hungarian Olympic silver medal-winning (1948) figure skater. 
Urpo Korhonen, 86, Finnish Olympic gold medal-winning (1952) cross-country skier. 
Sylvia Lennick, 93, Canadian actress and comedian, complications from pneumonia.
Merlyn Mantle, 77, American author, widow of Mickey Mantle, Alzheimer's disease.
Art McKinlay, 77, American Olympic silver medal-winning (1956) rower, heart attack.
Zarema Sadulayeva, 33, Russian activist, head of children's aid organization in Chechnya, shot.
Renzo Sambo, 67, Italian Olympic gold medal-winning (1968) rower. 
Thomas C. Slater, 68, American politician, member of the Rhode Island House of Representatives (since 1994), lung cancer.
Yosef Tamir, 94, Israeli politician and environmental activist, member of the Knesset (1965–1981).
Francisco Valdés, 66, Chilean footballer, heart failure.

11
Bektas Abubakirov, 36, Kazakhstani boxer.
Malik Akhmedilov, 33, Russian journalist, shot.
Campbell R. Bridges, 71, British gemologist and adventurer, speared.
Nuala Fennell, 73, Irish politician.
*José Ramón García Antón, 61, Spanish engineer and politician in Valencian Community.
Tom Hennies, 70, American police officer and politician.
Valeriu Lazarov, 73, Romanian-born Spanish television producer.
Aykut Oray, 67, Turkish actor, heart attack.
Behjat Sadr, 85, Iranian painter, heart attack.
Eunice Kennedy Shriver, 88, American activist, founder of the Special Olympics, sister of John F. Kennedy.
Jan Sillo, 32, South African footballer, traffic collision.
Kitty White, 86, American jazz vocalist, stroke.
Margaret Bush Wilson, 90, American lawyer and activist, multiple organ failure.

12
Rashied Ali, 74, American jazz drummer, heart attack.
Ruslan Amerkhanov, Russian official, Ingushetia construction minister, shot.
Howard M. Ervin, 93, American Christian scholar.
Ruth Ford, 98, American model and actress.
Gladys Gillem, 88, American professional wrestler, Alzheimer's disease.
John Gregson, Baron Gregson, 85, British businessman and politician.
Stephen MacDonald, 76, British actor, director and playwright.
Zaw One, 64, Burmese actor and singer, liver disease.
Nalin Seneviratne, 78, Sri Lankan general, Commander of the Army (1985–1988).
Karl Von Hess, 90, American professional wrestler, Alzheimer's disease.
Shingo Yamashiro, 70, Japanese actor, pneumonia.

13
John Bentley, 92, British actor (Crossroads).
M. Watt Espy, 77, American researcher and author on capital punishment.
Lavelle Felton, 29, American basketball player (Paderborn Baskets), shot.
Brian McLaughlin, 54, British footballer (Celtic, Motherwell).
Joseph Gilles Napoléon Ouellet, 87, Canadian archbishop of Rimouski.
Les Paul, 94, American guitarist and inventor, complications from pneumonia.
Al Purvis, 80, Canadian Olympic gold medal-winning ice hockey player (1952).
Dobby Walker, 90, American labor lawyer, stroke.
Eleutherius Winance, 100, Belgian-born American monk, philosophy professor, founder of St. Andrew's Abbey, heart attack.

14
Frank Branston, 70, British politician, Mayor of Bedford, aortic aneurysm.
John Hughes, 84, British politician, MP for Coventry North East (1987–1992). 
Ted Kennedy, 83, Canadian hockey player (Toronto Maple Leafs), heart failure.
Lawrence Lucie, 101, American jazz guitarist.
Kimani Maruge, 90, Kenyan student, oldest man to start primary school, stomach cancer.
Philip Saltzman, 80, Mexican-born American television writer and producer (Columbo, Barnaby Jones).
Gerolf Steiner, 101, German zoologist.

15
Charles Anderson, 91, Australian politician, member of the New South Wales Legislative Council (1951–1953).
Kenneth Bacon, 64, American president of Refugees International, Asst Secretary of Defense for Public Affairs, melanoma.
Florin Bogardo, 67, Romanian singer. 
Virginia Davis, 90, American child actress.
Jim Dickinson, 67, American musician and record producer.
Shūe Matsubayashi, 89, Japanese film director, heart failure. 
Abdel Latif Moussa, 50, Palestinian cleric, leader of Jund Ansar Allah, bomb blast.
Sammy Petrillo, 74, American comedian, cancer.
André Prokovsky, 70, French dancer, cancer.
Louis Rosen, 91, American nuclear physicist (Manhattan Project), inventor of the atom smasher, subdural hematoma.
John Stroud, 54, British television director.
Malcolm Richard Wilkey, 90, American federal judge and diplomat.

16
Alistair Campbell, 84, New Zealand poet.
Mualla Eyüboğlu, 90, Turkish architect, one of the country's first female architects, heart failure.
Paul Healion, 31, Irish cyclist, traffic collision.
Warren E. Hearnes, 86, American politician, Governor of Missouri (1965–1973).
Khalid bin Mahfouz, 60, Saudi Arabian billionaire banker, heart attack.
Richard Moore, 83, American cinematographer, co-founder of Panavision.
John Mulagada, 71, Indian Bishop of Eluru, first Dalit to become a bishop.
Ed Reimers, 96, American character actor (Star Trek, The Barefoot Executive).
Laurie Rowley, 68, British comedy writer (The Two Ronnies, Not the Nine O'Clock News), heart attack.
Robert Thieme, 91, American dispensationalist theologian.
Igor Tkachenko, 45, Russian Air Force pilot (Russian Knights), stunt collision.
Burl Toler, 81, American football official, first African American official in the NFL.

17
Paul Hogue, 69, American basketball player, heart and kidney failure.
Patricia Kippax, 67, British Olympic sprinter.
Tullio Kezich, 80, Italian film critic. 
Grażyna Miller, 52, Polish poet and translator.
Gildo Rodrigues, 69, Brazilian association football manager. 
Tiffany Simelane, 21, Swazi beauty pageant contestant, Miss Swaziland 2008, suicide by poisoning.
Reno Thomas, 87, American politician, member of the Pennsylvania House of Representatives.
Davey Williams, 81, American baseball player (New York Giants).
Viola Wyse, 61, Canadian Coast Salish tribal leader and civil servant.

18
Mir Maswood Ali, 80, Indian-born Canadian mathematician, idiopathic pulmonary fibrosis.
Hildegard Behrens, 72, German soprano, aortic aneurysm.
Charles Bond, 94, American Air Force general, pilot with Flying Tigers, dementia.
Wilf Diedricks, 64, South African cricket umpire.
Rose Friedman, 98, Ukrainian-born American economist, widow of Milton Friedman.
Jason Getsy, 33, American convicted murderer, execution by lethal injection.
Dic Jones, 75, Welsh poet.
*Kim Dae-jung, 83, South Korean politician, President (1998–2003), Nobel Peace Prize recipient, heart failure.
Hugo Loetscher, 79, Swiss author, complications from surgery.
Jack McGeorge, 60, American munitions analyst and BDSM activist, complications from heart surgery.
Peter Mui, 56, American fashion designer, heart failure.
Robert Novak, 78, American conservative author and pundit, brain cancer.
Fernanda Pivano, 92, Italian writer, journalist, translator and critic. 
Rufus Rogers, 96, New Zealand politician.
Mária Vadász, 59, Hungarian Olympic bronze medal-winning team handball player at 1976 Olympics. 
Geertje Wielema, 75, Dutch swimmer.

19
Paul Ashbee, 91, British archaeologist.
Carlos González Nova, 92, Mexican businessman.
Donald M. Grant, 82, American science fiction publisher.
Don Hewitt, 86, American television producer, creator of 60 Minutes, pancreatic cancer.
Harry Kermode, 87, Canadian Olympic basketball player.
John Marek, 47, American convicted murderer, execution by lethal injection.
Anthony Petro Mayalla, 69, Tanzanian archbishop of Mwanza (since 1987).
Edward Rondthaler, 104, American typographer.
Vic Snell, 81, English footballer (Ipswich Town).
Park M. Strader, 64, American politician, cancer.
Bobby Thomson, 65, British footballer, prostate cancer.

20
Marcel-André Buffet, 87, French Olympic sailor.
Semyon Farada, 75, Russian actor.
Larry Knechtel, 69, American keyboardist (Bread), bassist and session musician (The Beach Boys, The Doors), heart attack.
Karla Kuskin, 77, American children's author and illustrator, corticobasal degeneration.
Dudu Topaz, 62, Israeli actor, suicide by hanging.
Gordon Woods, 57, American veterinary scientist, created first cloned mule (Idaho Gem).

21
Ernest Brown, 93, American tap dancer.
Johnny Carter, 75, American singer (The Flamingos, The Dells), lung cancer.
Edward Goldsmith, 80, British environmentalist.
Christopher John Lamb, 59, British biochemist.
Chris McCubbins, 63, American-born Canadian Olympic athlete, leukemia.
Leo Obstbaum, 40, Argentine-born Spanish design director for the 2010 Winter Olympics.
Rex Shelley, 78, Singaporean author, lung cancer.
Geoffrey Tozer, 54, Australian pianist, liver disease.
Dean Turner, 37, Australian bassist (Magic Dirt), lung cancer.
Pedro Yoma, 82, Chilean Olympic track and field athlete.

22
David Avadon, 60, American illusionist, heart attack.
Horst E. Brandt, 86, German film director.
Vicki Cruse, 40, American aerobatic pilot, air show accident.
Muriel Duckworth, 100, Canadian feminist and activist, complications from a fall.
Elmer Kelton, 83, American Western novelist.
Iftikhar Ali Khan, Pakistani general, Defence Secretary (1997–1999), heart attack.
Erkki Laine, 51, Finnish ice hockey player, drowned. 
Beryl Sprinkel, 85, American economist, Lambert-Eaton myasthenic syndrome.
Adrien Zeller, 69, French politician and humanist, heart attack.

23
Alexander Bozhkov, 58, Bulgarian politician, Deputy Prime Minister (1997–1999), cancer.
Stanley Kaplan, 90, American businessman and scholastic test preparation pioneer, founder of Kaplan, Inc., heart disease.
Anna-Maria Müller, 60, German luger, 1972 Winter Olympics women's singles gold medalist.
Pierre Samuel, 87, French mathematician, arms control and environmental activist. 
Jan Sedivka, 91, Australian violinist.
Edzo Toxopeus, 91, Dutch politician, Minister of the Interior (1959–1965). 
William Williams, 93, American businessman and team owner (Cincinnati Bengals, Cincinnati Reds).

24
Joseph Corbett, Jr., 80, American murderer and kidnapper, suicide by gunshot.
Sir Harry Fang, 86, Hong Kong orthopaedic surgeon, President of Rehabilitation International (1980–1984), respiratory failure.
Frank Marcus Fernando, 77, Sri Lankan Bishop of Chilaw.
Leif Flengsrud, 86, Norwegian Olympic cyclist. 
Janullah Hashimzada, 40, Afghan journalist, Pakistan bureau chief for Shamshad TV, shot.
Kashin, 40, New Zealand Asian elephant sponsored by ASB Bank, euthanised.
Joe Maneri, 82, American jazz composer, musician and inventor, complications from heart surgery.
Eduardo V. Roquero, 59, Filipino politician, Representative (2004–2007), four-time Mayor of San Jose del Monte.
Toni Sailer, 73, Austrian ski racer, laryngeal cancer.
T. J. Turner, 46, American football player (Miami Dolphins), complications from a stroke.
Jim Urbanek, 64, American football player (Miami Dolphins).

25
Berle Adams, 92, American music industry executive (MCA).
Bob Carroll, 73, American historian and author.
William Emerson, 86, American journalist and editor, stroke.
Nikos Garoufallou, 72, Greek actor, traffic collision. 
*Ted Kennedy, 77, American politician, Senator from Massachusetts (1962–2009), brain cancer.
Eduardo Mendoza Goiticoa, 92, Venezuelan politician, Minister of Agriculture (1945–1947), director of the Human Rights Foundation.
Carl K. Moeddel, 71, American Auxiliary Bishop of Cincinnati (1993–2007).
Ray Ramsey, 88, American football player (Chicago Cardinals), complications from a fall.
Mandé Sidibé, 69, Malian politician and economist, Prime Minister (2000–2002).

26
Abdul Aziz al-Hakim, 56, Iraqi politician, lung cancer.
Hyman Bloom, 96, Latvian-born American painter of mystical Jewish works.
Per Christensen, 75, Norwegian actor (Hotel Cæsar, Elling). 
Sadie Corré, 91, British actress (The Rocky Horror Picture Show).
Dominick Dunne, 83, American writer and investigative journalist, bladder cancer.
Ellie Greenwich, 68, American songwriter ("Be My Baby", "Chapel of Love"), heart attack.
Sir Jack Harris, 2nd Baronet, 103, British-born New Zealand businessman.
Billy Kenneally, 83, Irish politician.
William Korey, 87, American lobbyist, Anti-Defamation League director, cardiac arrhythmia.
Lin Hui-kuan, 51, Taiwanese politician, MLY (2002–2009), sepsis.
Birger Skeie, 58, Norwegian marine services company chairman, heart attack.

27
Harry Bell, 83, Canadian ice hockey player.
Nicholas Cavendish, 6th Baron Chesham, 67, British aristocrat and politician.
Shota Chochishvili, 59, Georgian Olympic gold medalist in judo, leukemia.
Alex Grass, 82, American businessman, founder of Rite Aid drugstores, lung cancer.
Dave Laut, 52, American Olympic bronze medalist in shot put, shot.
Sergey Mikhalkov, 96, Russian writer and poet (National Anthem of the Soviet Union and National Anthem of Russia).
Rafiu Oluwa, 78, Nigerian Olympic sprinter.
Joaquín Ruiz-Giménez, 96, Spanish politician. 
Virgilio Savona, 89, Italian singer (Quartetto Cetra), Parkinson's disease. 
Shing Fui-On, 54, Hong Kong actor, nasopharyngeal carcinoma.

28
Chanel, 21, American world's oldest dog.
Richard Egan, 73, American businessman and diplomat, suicide by gunshot.
Emil Glad, 81, Croatian actor. 
Adam Goldstein, 36, American club disc jockey and musician (Crazy Town), suspected drug overdose.
Noel Debroy Jones, 76, British prelate, Bishop of Sodor and Man (1989–2003), cancer.
Günter Kießling, 83, German general. 
Eli Thompson, 36, American skydiver, skydiving accident.
Wayne Tippit, 76, American character actor (Melrose Place), respiratory insufficiency.
Henk van Ulsen, 82, Dutch actor.

29
Gennaro Angiulo, 90, American Mafia underboss, renal failure.
Chris Connor, 81, American jazz singer, cancer.
Simon Dee, 74, British radio disc jockey and television presenter, bone cancer.
Sam Etcheverry, 79, American-born Canadian football player, member of the Canadian Football Hall of Fame, cancer.
Gustavo Martínez Frías, 74, Colombian archbishop of Nueva Pamplona.
Frank Gardner, 78, Australian motor racing driver.
Pete Horeck, 86, Canadian ice hockey player, prostate cancer.
Mady Rahl, 94, German actress. 
Dave Smith, 76, American college football player and coach, cancer.
Yolanda Varela, 79, Mexican film actress.

30
Medardas Čobotas, 81, Lithuanian politician. 
Ildikó Kishonti, 62, Hungarian actress.
Marie Knight, 84, American gospel singer, pneumonia.
Sheila Lukins, 66, American cook and food writer, brain cancer.
Robert J. Matthews, 82, American Latter-day Saints educator and scholar, open-heart surgery complications.
Christos Palaiologos, 59, Greek left-wing politician, former mayor of Livadeia, 
Jack Phillips, 87, American baseball player.
Mark Pringle, 50, Australian triathlete, road accident.
Kiki Sørum, 70, Norwegian fashion journalist. 
Nancy Talbot, 89, American businesswoman, co-founder of Talbots retail stores, Alzheimer's disease.
Percy Tetzlaff, 89, New Zealand rugby union player (Waikato, Auckland, national team).
Simon Thirgood, 46, British biologist and ecologist, building collapse.

31
Asbjørn Aarseth, 73, Norwegian literary historian.
Abu Abbas, 75, Bangladeshi politician.
William Wright Abbot, 87, American archivist and historian, congestive heart failure.
John Choi Young-su, 67, South Korean archbishop of Daegu.
Ping Duenas, 78, Guamanian politician, heart attack.
Barry Flanagan, 68, British sculptor, motor neurone disease.
Jesse Fortune, 79, American blues singer.
Frederick Gore, 95, British artist.
Amos Hawley, 98, American sociologist.
Eddie Higgins, 77, American jazz pianist, cancer.
Torsten Lindberg, 92, Swedish Olympic gold medal-winning (1948) football player. 
Eraño Manalo, 84, Filipino Executive Minister of the Iglesia ni Cristo (1963–2009), cardiopulmonary arrest.
Jack Manning, 93, American film, stage and television actor.
Anna Belle Clement O'Brien, 86, American politician, Tennessee state senator (1976–1996), complications from a fall.
George Piranian, 95, American mathematician.

References

2009-08
 08